Wettinia drudei is a species of flowering plant in the family Arecaceae. It is found in Brazil, Colombia, Ecuador, and Peru.

References

drudei
Flora of the Amazon
Least concern plants
Least concern biota of South America
Taxonomy articles created by Polbot
Trees of Peru